Uvarovo is a town in Tambov Oblast, Russia, located on the right bank of the Vorona River (Don's basin),  southeast of Tambov. Population:

History
It was founded in 1699 as a Cossack settlement and became a selo in 1702. In 1770, a postal road was built through Uvarovo, which connected Borisoglebsk and Kirsanov. In the second half of the 19th–early 20th century, Uvarovo became an important commercial center. In 1960, it was granted urban-type settlement status and in 1966—town status.

Administrative and municipal status
Within the framework of administrative divisions, Uvarovo serves as the administrative center of Uvarovsky District, even though it is not a part of it. As an administrative division, it is incorporated separately as the town of oblast significance of Uvarovo—an administrative unit with the status equal to that of the districts. As a municipal division, the town of oblast significance of Uvarovo is incorporated as Uvarovo Urban Okrug.

Notable residents 

Andrei Streltsov (born 1984), footballer

References

Notes

Sources

Cities and towns in Tambov Oblast
Populated places established in 1699
1699 establishments in Russia